Malta participated in the Eurovision Song Contest 2006 with the song "I Do" written by Aldo Spiteri and Fabrizio Faniello. The song was performed by Fabrizio Faniello, who had previously represented Malta at the Eurovision Song Contest in the 2001 edition where he achieved ninth place with the song "Another Summer Night". The Maltese entry for the 2006 contest in Athens, Greece was selected through the national final Malta Song for Europe 2006, organised by the Maltese broadcaster Public Broadcasting Services (PBS). The competition consisted of a final, held on 4 February 2006, where "I Do" performed by Fabrizio Faniello eventually emerged as the winning entry after gaining 12% of the public televote.

As one of the ten highest placed finishers in 2005, Malta automatically qualified to compete in the final of the Eurovision Song Contest. Performing during the show in position 7, Malta placed twenty-fourth (last) out of the 24 participating countries with 1 point.

Background 

Prior to the 2006 Contest, Malta had participated in the Eurovision Song Contest eighteen times since its first entry in 1971. Malta briefly competed in the Eurovision Song Contest in the 1970s before withdrawing for sixteen years. The country had, to this point, competed in every contest since returning in 1991. Malta's best placing in the contest thus far was second, which it achieved on two occasions: in 2002 with the song "7th Wonder" performed by Ira Losco and in the 2005 contest with the song "Angel" performed by Chiara.

For the 2006 Contest, the Maltese national broadcaster, Public Broadcasting Services (PBS), broadcast the event within Malta and organised the selection process for the nation's entry. PBS confirmed their intentions to participate at it on 18 August 2005. Malta selected their entry consistently through a national final procedure, a method that was continued for their 2006 participation.

Before Eurovision

Malta Song for Europe 2006 
Malta Song for Europe 2006 was the national final format developed by PBS to select the Maltese entry for the Eurovision Song Contest 2006. The competition was held on 4 February 2006 at the Mediterranean Conference Centre in the nation's capital city of Valletta. The show was hosted by Eileen Montesin, Josef Bonello and Lou Bondi and broadcast on Television Malta (TVM) as well on the website di-ve.com.

Format 
The competition consisted of eighteen songs competing in the final on 4 February 2006 where the results were determined exclusively by public televoting. Two of the songs were selected through the competition Opportunity 2, broadcast during the TVM programme Showtime between 8 October 2005 and 9 December 2005 and consisted of thirty-six competing songs. In the event of technical difficulties in the televoting system, the results were determined by the votes of back-up judges.

Competing entries 
Artists and composers were able to submit their entries for Malta Song for Europe 2006 between 30 October 2005 and 5 December 2005. Songwriters from any nationality were able to submit songs as long as entry applications from foreign songwriters were eligible in their country. Artists were required to be Maltese or possess Maltese citizenship and could submit as many songs as they wished, however, they could only compete with a maximum of one in the competition. 213 entries were received by the broadcaster. For Opportunity 2, only artists that have never competed in Malta Song for Europe were able to submit their entries between 18 August 2005 and 14 September 2005. On 9 December 2005, PBS announced the song titles of 35 shortlisted entries that had progressed through the selection process of Malta Song for Europe 2006, and sixteen of the songs selected to compete in the competition were announced on 17 December 2006.

Among the selected competing artists were former Maltese Eurovision entrants Paul Giordimaina who represented Malta in the 1991 contest, and Fabrizio Faniello who represented Malta in the 2001 contest. Among the songwriters, Jason Cassar, Paul Abela, Ray Agius, Sunny Aquilina, Gerard James Borg and Philip Vella were all past writers of Maltese Eurovision entries. Miriam Christine Warner represented Malta in the 1996 edition. On 22 December 2005, "Turn Another Page", written by Paul Giordimaina and Fleur Balzan and to have been performed by Pamela, was withdrawn from the competition and replaced with the song "Stronger" performed by Christian Arding. Claudia Faniello and Anabelle Debono replaced Olivia Lewis and Nadine Axisa as the performers of the songs "Amazing" and "High Alert", respectively, due to both singers having been selected with two songs each.

Opportunity 2 
Opportunity 2 took place over ten shows between 8 October 2005 and 7 January 2006. Thirty-six songs competed for ten qualifying spots in the final show, during which the two remaining spots in Malta Song for Europe 2006 were announced.

Final 
The final took place on 4 February 2006. Eighteen entries competed and the winner was determined solely by a public televote. The interval act of the show featured performances by former Maltese Eurovision entrants Georgina Abela, William Mangion, Mike Spiteri, Claudette Pace and Chiara, Lou Bondi and the local acts Alex Manché and Ray Calleja. After the results of the public televote were announced, "I Do" performed by Fabrizio Faniello was the winner. "Echoes of Gaia" performed by Charlene and Natasha received the most votes from the back-up jury panel.

At Eurovision
The Eurovision Song Contest 2006 took place at the Nikos Galis Olympic Indoor Hall in Athens, Greece and consisted of a semi-final on 18 May and the final of 20 May 2006. According to Eurovision rules, all nations with the exceptions of the host country, the "Big Four" (France, Germany, Spain and the United Kingdom) and the ten highest placed finishers in the 2005 contest are required to qualify from the semi-final in order to compete for the final; the top ten countries from the semi-final progress to the final. As one of the ten highest placed finishers in the 2006 contest, Malta automatically qualified to compete in the final. In addition to their participation in the final, Malta is also required to broadcast and vote in the semi-final. On 21 March 2006, a special allocation draw was held which determined the running order and Malta was set to perform in position 7 during the final, following the entry from Spain and before the entry from Germany. Malta placed twenty-fourth (last) in the final, scoring 1 point.

The semi-final and the final were broadcast in Malta on TVM with commentary by Eileen Montesin. The Maltese spokesperson, who announced the Maltese votes during the final, was Moira Delia.

Voting 
Below is a breakdown of points awarded to Malta and awarded by Malta in the semi-final and grand final of the contest. The nation awarded its 12 points to Sweden in the semi-final and to Switzerland in the final of the contest.

Points awarded to Malta

Points awarded by Malta

Notes and references

Notes

References

2006
Countries in the Eurovision Song Contest 2006
Eurovision